Șasa River may refer to:

 Șasa, a tributary of the Bistra Mărului
 Șasa, a tributary of the Băiaș in Vâlcea County